Good Times is the first soundtrack album by American pop duo Sonny & Cher, released in 1967 by  Atlantic/Atco Records in conjunction with the film of the same name.

Album information 
It was released in 1967 and reached #73 on the Billboard album charts.

The first single released was "It's the Little Things" reaching in the US #50 and in Canada at #3. Other single releases were "Caro Cara", the Italian version of "It's The Little Things" and the B-side "Fantasie" the Italian version of "Don't Talk to Strangers". The single was released exclusively for the Italian market, but the song didn't enter in the chart. Another single, a rerecorded version of their #1 hit I Got You Babe.

All the songs on the album were written by Bono. The song "I'm Gonna Love You" was recorded for the debut album of Cher All I Really Want to Do but was cut and used for the B-side of "All I Really Want to Do" single.

Track listing
All tracks composed by Sonny Bono

Side A
"I Got You Babe" (Instrumental) - 4:48
"It's the Little Things" - 3:05
"Good Times" - 5:18
"Trust Me" - 4:43

Side B
"Don't Talk to Strangers" - 2:46
"I'm Gonna Love You" - 2:37
"Just a Name" - 6:30
"I Got You Babe" - 2:17

Charts

Credits

Personnel
Main vocals: Cher
Main vocals: Sonny Bono

Production
Sonny Bono: Conductor
William Friedkin: Liner notes

References

Sonny & Cher albums
1967 soundtrack albums
Atco Records soundtracks
Atlantic Records soundtracks
Albums produced by Sonny Bono
Albums conducted by Sonny Bono
Comedy film soundtracks
Musical film soundtracks